KCGM may refer to:

 KCGM (FM) a radio station in Scobey, Montana.
 Kalgoorlie Consolidated Gold Mines Pty Ltd a subsidiary of Northern Star Resources that operates the Super Pit gold mine in Kalgoorlie, Western Australia